Ras-related protein Rab-4A is a protein that in humans is encoded by the RAB4A gene.

Interactions 

RAB4A has been shown to interact with:
 CD2AP, 
 KIF3B,
 RAB11FIP1, 
 RABEP1,  and
 STX4.

References

Further reading